Joseph Arridy (April 29, 1915 – January 6, 1939) was an American man who was falsely convicted and wrongfully executed for the 1936 rape and murder of Dorothy Drain, a 15-year-old girl in Pueblo, Colorado. He was manipulated by the police to make a false confession due to his mental incapacities. Arridy was mentally disabled and was 23 years old when he was executed on January 6, 1939.

Many people at the time and since believed that Arridy was innocent. A group known as Friends of Joe Arridy formed and in 2007 commissioned the first tombstone for his grave. They also supported the preparation of a petition by David A. Martinez, Denver attorney, for a state pardon to clear Arridy's name. 

In 2011, Arridy received a full and unconditional posthumous pardon by Colorado Governor Bill Ritter (72 years after his death). Ritter, the former district attorney of Denver, pardoned Arridy based on questions about the man's guilt and what appeared to be a coerced false confession. This was the first time in Colorado that the governor had pardoned a convict after execution.

Early life
Arridy was born in 1915 in Pueblo, Colorado, to Mary and Henry Arridy, recent immigrants from Syria (then part of the Ottoman Empire), who were seeking work; they did not speak English. Henry took a job with  a major steel mill in Pueblo that he learned was hiring workers. Arridy never spoke for the first five years of his life. After he attended one year at elementary school, his principal told his parents to keep him at home, saying that he could not learn. After losing his job a few years later, his father appealed to friends to help him find a place for his son. Arridy was admitted at the age of ten to the State Home and Training School for Mental Defectives in Grand Junction, Colorado, where he lived on and off until becoming a young adult. Both in his neighborhood and at the school, he was often mistreated and beaten by his peers. He left the school and hopped on freight railcars to leave the city, ending up at the age of 21 in the railyards of Cheyenne, Wyoming, by late August 1936.

Attack
On August 14, 1936, two girls of the Drain family were attacked while sleeping at home in Pueblo, Colorado. Both 15-year-old Dorothy and her 12-year-old sister Barbara Drain were bludgeoned by an intruder with what was believed to be a hatchet. Dorothy was also raped; she died from the hatchet attack, while Barbara survived.

Arrest and conviction
On August 26, 1936, Arridy was arrested for vagrancy in Cheyenne, Wyoming, after being caught wandering around the railyards. The county sheriff, George Carroll, was aware of the widespread search for suspects in the Drain murder case. When Arridy revealed under questioning that he had traveled through Pueblo by way of a train after leaving Grand Junction, Colorado, Carroll began to question him about the Drain case. Carroll said that Arridy confessed to him. 

When Carroll contacted the Pueblo police chief Arthur Grady about Arridy, he learned that they had already arrested a man considered to be the prime suspect: Frank Aguilar, a laborer from Mexico. Aguilar had worked for the father of the Drain girls and been fired shortly before the attack. An axe head was recovered from Aguilar's home. Sheriff Carroll claimed that Arridy told him several times he had "been with a man named Frank" at the crime scene.  Aguilar later confessed to the crime and told police he had never seen or met Arridy. Aguilar was also convicted of the rape and murder of Dorothy Drain and sentenced to death. He was executed in 1937. 

After being transported to Pueblo, Arridy reportedly confessed again. 

When the case was finally taken to trial, Arridy's lawyer pled insanity to spare his client's life. Arridy was ruled to be sane, while acknowledged by three state psychiatrists to be so mentally limited as to be classified as an "imbecile", a medical term at the time. They said he had an IQ of 46, and the mind of a six-year-old. They noted he was "incapable of distinguishing between right and wrong, and therefore, would be unable to perform any action with a criminal intent". 

Arridy was convicted, largely because of his false confession. Studies since that time have shown that persons of limited mental capacity are more vulnerable to coercion during interrogation and have a higher frequency of making false confessions. There was no physical evidence against him. Barbara Drain had testified that Aguilar had been present at the attack, but not Arridy. She could identify Aguilar because he had worked for her father.

Appeals
Attorney Gail L. Ireland, who later was elected and served as Colorado Attorney General and Colorado Water Commissioner, became involved as defense counsel in Arridy's case after his conviction and sentencing. While Ireland won delays of Arridy's execution, he was unable to get his conviction overturned or commutation of his sentence. He noted that Aguilar had said he acted alone, and medical experts had testified as to Arridy's mental limitations. Ireland said that Arridy could not even understand what execution meant. "Believe me when I say that if he is gassed, it will take a long time for the state of Colorado to live down the disgrace", Ireland argued to the Colorado Supreme Court. Arridy received nine stays of execution as appeals and petitions on his behalf were mounted.

Execution
While held on death row during the appeals process, Arridy often played with a toy train, given to him by prison warden Roy Best. The warden said that Arridy was "the happiest prisoner on death row". He was liked and treated well by both the prisoners and guards alike. Best became one of Arridy's supporters and joined the effort to save his life; he was said to have "cared for Arridy like a son", regularly bringing him gifts. Before Arridy's execution, he said, "He probably didn't even know he was about to die, all he did was happily sit and play with a toy train I had given him." 

For his last meal, Arridy requested ice cream. When questioned about his impending execution, he showed "blank bewilderment". He did not understand the meaning of the gas chamber, telling the warden "No, no, Joe won't die." Before being taken away to the chamber, Joe reportedly had not finished his ice cream and requested for the remaining ice cream to be refrigerated so he could eat it later, not understanding that he was to be executed soon and would not return. He was reported to have smiled while being taken to the gas chamber. Momentarily nervous, he calmed down when the warden grabbed his hand and reassured him. Members of the victim's family did not witness the execution. Roy Best was noted to have been crying during the execution, with him pleading with Teller Ammons, the Governor of Colorado, to commute Arridy's sentence before the execution. Ammons refused to commute Arridy's sentence or to pardon him.

2011 posthumous pardon
Arridy's case is one of a number that received new attention in the face of research into ensuring just interrogations and confessions. In addition, the US Supreme Court ruled that it was unconstitutional to apply the death penalty to convicted persons who are mentally disabled. A group of supporters formed the non-profit Friends of Joe Arridy and worked to bring new recognition to the injustice of his case, in addition to commissioning a tombstone for his grave in 2007. 

Attorney David A. Martinez became involved and relied on Robert Perske's book about Arridy's case, as well as other materials compiled by the Friends, and his own research, to prepare a 400-page petition for pardon from Governor Bill Ritter, a former district attorney in Denver. Based on the evidence and other reviews, Ritter gave Arridy a full and unconditional pardon in 2011, saying "Pardoning Joe Arridy cannot undo this tragic event in Colorado history, it is in the interests of justice and simple decency, however, to restore his good name."

Legacy
In June 2007 about 50 supporters of Arridy gathered for the dedication of a tombstone they had commissioned for his grave at Woodpecker Hill in Cañon City's Greenwood Cemetery near the state prison.

Representation in other media

 Arridy was the subject of a 1944 poem, "The Clinic", by writer Marguerite Young.
 Robert Perske wrote Deadly Innocence? (1964/reprint 1995) about Arridy's case after conducting research on it and similar cases for years. He had tracked down the author of the 1944 poem before Young's death. His book also explores other cases in which defendants were classified as disabled, and implications for police and the justice system.
 In 2007–2008 producers Max and Micheline Keller, George Edde, and Yvonne Karouni, and Dan Leonetti, screenwriter, announced plans to make a film about Arridy and Gail Ireland, to be called The Woodpecker Waltz. Leonetti won a New York screenwriting award for his screenplay, which attracted attention by producers.
Terri Bradt wrote a biography of her grandfather, Gail Ireland: Colorado Citizen Lawyer (2011). She was proud of his defense of Arridy, and began to work with the Friends of Joe Arridy on making his cause more widely known.

See also
 Capital punishment in the United States
 List of wrongful convictions in the United States
 Ricky Ray Rector

References

1915 births
1939 deaths
American people of Syrian descent
American people with disabilities
American people executed for murder
20th-century executions of American people
People from Pueblo, Colorado
People with intellectual disability
Recipients of American gubernatorial pardons
20th-century executions by Colorado
Executed people from Colorado
Wrongful executions
People executed by Colorado by gas chamber
American people wrongfully convicted of murder
Overturned convictions in the United States
People who have received posthumous pardons